Kurukove was a fresh water lake located in the central Ukrainian oblast of Poltava on the right bank of the Dnieper, opposite to Kremenchuk.

History 
It was place of  near  delta  between Ukrainian Cossacks and the Poles in  25 October – 3 November 1625.
In 1625, the Treaty of Kurukove was signed at the site between the Ukrainian Cossacks and the Poles.

References 

Geography of Poltava Oblast
Kurukove
Former lakes of Europe